The German West African Company, in German Deutsch-Westafrikanische Gesellschaft / Compagnie, was a German chartered company, founded in 1885.  It exploited the two German protectorates in German West Africa (Togo and Cameroon) but did not actually govern them — unlike its counterpart in German East Africa.

History 
The German West African Company was established as a chartered company with a headquarters in Hamburg.  The company was active in both Kamerun and Togoland.  Following years of little profits, the company was absorbed by the German Empire on November 13, 1903.

Kamerun 

Now modern day Cameroon.

Togo

Now modern day Togo and part of Ghana.

See also 
 German colonial empire
 German East Africa Company

Sources and references 

Horst Gründer, Geschichte der deutschen Kolonien, 4th ed. (Paderborn, Ferdinand Schöningh, 2000).
 CRWFlags.com contains its flag
 WorldStatesmen- here Cameroon & Togo

Chartered companies
Defunct companies of Germany
Kamerun
History of Togo
German companies established in 1885
Companies disestablished in 1906
1885 establishments in Africa
1885 establishments in the German colonial empire
1903 disestablishments in Africa
1903 disestablishments in the German colonial empire